Askham Bog is small area of peat bog and Site of Special Scientific Interest situated within the Vale of York in North Yorkshire, England. It lies to the south-west of York, north of Copmanthorpe and near Askham Richard and Askham Bryan. It is regarded as one of the most ecologically diverse sites in Northern England.

During the 2010s, a development of 500 houses was proposed for the edge of the bog on the outskirts of York city, but this was overturned in 2020.

History and geographical formation

Askham Bog formed within the Vale of York in a hollow which became flooded with melt-water from the last glacial melt about 15,000 years ago. Two ridges of terminal moraine had formed on both sides of the hollow and contained the glacial melt-water between and behind them.

The bog is sealed with a bottom-most layer largely comprising boulder clay, sand and gravel. On top, there is a distinct layering of organic deposits, collectively reflecting a series of biological and geological periods. The basal clay layer is overlaid with further lake clay and a nutrient-rich nekron mud supplied by surrounding moraines. Continuing further up are layers of fen peat and sphagnum peat, of which the latter also contains traces of Scorpidium and Eriophorum. The nekron mud layer reflects a permanent switch to a relatively warm post-glacial climate during which this layer formed. It contains an abundance of plant remains which in turn reflect a period of rich floral growth at this time. Some of these plants include Potamogeton, holly-leaved naiad and bogbean.

However, subsequent colonization by common reed, whose fossilized root fragments have been found immediately above the nekron mud layer, lead to a reduced extent of open water. In turn, a layer of fen peat gradually accumulated above the mud in the bog centre to begin forming a raised bog. The increased elevation of the central peat mound began to cut off the direct influx of base-rich waters into the bog from the surrounding land and existing bases in the raised peat were leached out through rainfall. Therefore, net loss of bases from the peat in the centre of the bog gradually led to increased soil acidity, with loss of the original rich fen community which previously covered the whole area.

Consequently, the nutrient-poor, acid surface enabled sphagnum mosses to thrive on the raised bog and contribute greatly to the bulk of peat forming above the fen margins. The continued net accumulation of peat in the centre relative to the margins led to a further increase in elevation of the central peat dome, so that supply of base-rich groundwater was prevented completely, therefore rendering the peat centre ombrotrophic. Conversely, the marginal rich-fen community which receives influx of base-rich groundwater from the surrounding moraines makes ecological conditions here similar to those on the East Anglican Fens.

A site on the edge of Askham Bog was earmarked by a developer for a plot of 500 homes. The appeal by the community and Yorkshire Wildlife Trust enlisted the help of Sir David Attenborough, who said that "it is our collective responsibility to save it." The development was denied by planning inspectors in May 2020.

Ecology and habitats

Askham Bog is regarded as one of the most ecologically diverse sites in Northern England; especially regarding plants, invertebrates and birds. The ecological diversity is attributable to a wide diversity of habitats ranging from fen-meadow with base-rich ground on the periphery to more inward carr woodland and raised bog with acid soil; interspersed with dykes and stands of open water. The large habitat diversity may be partly explained by the many successional stages present which generally become more advanced towards the centre, in turn related to spatial differences in topography and soil pH.  Askham Bog is one of the few northern examples in England to show such an array of habitat transitions.

Although the raised bog originally largely replaced the original fen, medieval peat cutting brought the vegetation back within the influence of base-rich ground water. The extensive peat cutting in turn led to a return to fen conditions around some of the previously acid soils.

Askham Bog is extensively wooded, with birch being ubiquitous throughout the mire. Willow also grows extensively throughout. Alder and grey sallow are locally dominant on the fenny margins and oak being so in the acid centre. Other tree species growing alongside oak in the acid centre include hazel, alder buckthorn and rowan. Birch has however recently declined in favour of oak, alder and ash, especially where much of the wood in the north central part has been clear-felled. The canopy reduction in the centre of the bog appears to have negatively affected sphagnum growth here probably because of reduced shading and therefore increased desiccation of sphagnum and easier influx of atmospheric pollutants. Increased sulphur deposition has been recorded on the bog in recent decades and is attributable to increasingly polluted air moving downwind from a major industrial area with coal-burning power stations.

Natural history

Herbaceous plants

The flora of Askham Bog is not only diverse, but also distinctly resembles plant assemblies in southern England. Notable species include greater spearwort, marsh stitchwort, saw sedge, marsh fern, great water dock, meadow thistle, purple small reed, Carex appropinquata and water violet. Askham Bog also holds the largest and most north-eastern colony in England of the rare gingerbread sedge Carex elongata, and is renowned for the presence of royal fern.

The vegetation of Askham Bog can be divided into two main groups, reflecting the broad underlying dichotomy between basic and acidic soil. One is a species-rich fen community around the margins. This includes characteristic species such as meadowsweet, common meadow rue, stinging nettle, marsh bedstraw, dewberry, bittersweet, skullcap, yellow loosestrife, creeping Jenny and rough meadow grass. The other community is a species-poor acid one towards the centre, including species such as Sphagnum palustre, purple moor grass, Rubus fruticosus and honeysuckle. Although the drop in pH and elevational increase on the peat domes is attributable to sphagnum growth, no sphagnum has been found in one vegetation assemblage characterized by honeysuckle and Rubus fruticosus within the acid centre of the bog. This appears to be inconsistent with the usual course of succession and may be explained by unusually high concentration of inorganic phosphate. Low water tables in the raised area may promote mineralization of phosphate, with low pH counteracting microbial conversion to organic phosphate, so that the resultant high inorganic phosphate component in the raised peat favours growth of this plant community.

Birds
Over 90 bird species have been recorded on the bog, attracting both winter and summer visitors. Despite nearby potential sources of human disturbance, the bog provides a suitable shelter within a relatively bare surrounding agricultural landscape and has a rich fruit and seed supply in winter and a richness of invertebrates in summer. Known residents include marsh tit, willow tit, treecreeper, kingfisher, goldcrest, bullfinch, tawny owl, buzzard, sparrowhawk and sometimes green woodpecker Winter visitors include fieldfare, redwing, brambling, siskin, lesser redpoll, goldfinch, snipe, jack snipe, woodcock, coot and sometimes grasshopper warbler. All migrant warblers have been found at the bog in spring and summer, with the reed beds in the northeast part in Near Wood comprising an important colony for reed warblers.

Invertebrates
Askham Bog is rich in invertebrates, and is nationally known for its diversity of water beetles such as Haliplidae, Noteridae, Dytiscidae and Gyrinidae. Some rare beetle species include Dromius sigma, Agabus undulatus; alongside one record of Pselaphus dresdensis which has been found in moss from pond sides at the bog and nowhere else in England. However, beetle abundance and species richness have been noticeably declining at Askham Bog since the early 20th century, coinciding with the establishment of a municipal dumping ground at the adjacent Challoner's Whin. Other characteristic insect species include the fen square-spot moth and the emperor dragonfly.

Regarding spiders, there is a surprisingly large proportion of wetland indicator species given the relatively dry status of the reserve and gradual encroachment by trees. This may be because the spider community reflects a time when the bog was wetter and is yet to completely respond to the habitat changes. A very rare spider species Cornicularia kochi (O.P.-C) in its hundreds has been recorded in piles of cut-down Phragmites during winter.

Mammals and amphibians
Typical amphibians of Askham Bog include common frog, common toad, and smooth newt. Typical mammals include roe deer and red foxes. The water vole was once common at Askham Bog, but has now been largely eradicated by the American mink.

Past use and current management

Peat cutting
From the early Roman period until the mid-18th century, Askham Bog and its vicinity appeared to be intensely exploited for peat as fuel. The earliest evidence of nearby peat cutting from the Roman period has been found in a Roman well in York in the form of lumps of sphagnum peat.

In the Middle Ages, peat was cut especially by the villagers of Dringhouses and Acomb. Documentary evidence for this exists in the written bylaws of the Manor of Drighouses and Acomb Court Rolls restricting peat cutting by tenants. The severe penalties imposed by these legal restrictions testify to the need to counteract the damaging intensity with which peat would have been extracted from the bog. In fact, intensive peat cutting had probably caused substantial topographical changes on the bog since its original geographic formation. In turn, a lowering of the acid peat layer due to extraction would have allowed the centre to become flooded by base-rich groundwater, thereby re-transforming it into an open fen. Other material evidence exists in the form of dykes surrounding the current main peat domes, of which the former would have been dug to aid removal of peat by boat.

The whole bog reverted to tree cover after cessation of peat cutting around the 1750s. It was then extensively used as game covert from the late 19th century until the Second World War, which probably explains the extensive felling of Far Wood during this time. The bog was acquired in 1946 by Sir Francis Terry and Joseph Rowntree, who subsequently both awarded it to Yorkshire Naturalists' Trust (now Yorkshire Wildlife Trust) in 1946. It is Yorkshire Wildlife Trust's oldest nature reserve.

Hemp cultivation
There is fossil evidence in the form of hemp achenes and pollen found preserved in distinct horizons between layers of fen peat and Scorpidium-Sphagnum peat that this plant was once cultivated at Askham Bog These seeds and pollen are possible relics of retting (steeping in water) of hemp because pollen of aquatic plants such as water lilies and cattails have been found together with hemp seeds and pollen in the same peat cores, therefore suggesting that these hemp remnants were submerged during this period.

Although exact time spans are unknown, cultivation of hemp at Askham was probably intense in the Tudor period when the crop was grown and retted extensively and by royal decree in England for hempen ropes for the British navy. There is some documentary evidence for this at Askham Bog in the Acomb Court Roll of 1594, which restricted where hemp could be retted (steeped) owing to the malodour produced by retted fibres and the potential for the retting water to pollute rivers. However, hemp retting ceased in the 19th century with increased importation of hempen rope from Europe and Russia and the increasing reversion to sisal from America and jute from India.

Habitat conservation
The commitment to preserve and conserve Askham Bog was the original motivation for the Trust's establishment. The first management plan aimed to maintain habitat diversity throughout the bog. With the aid of the National Conservation Corps, more open water was created through pond digging and dyke blocking, along with scrub clearance in the damp cotton-grass areas. In 1998, Yorkshire Wildlife Trust obtained a substantial Heritage Lottery Fund for restoration of many of its nature reserves. A considerable proportion of this grant was invested in management of Askham Bog to ensure adequate water quality and level required for the bog wildlife.

Most of the species-rich fen areas are grazed by Exmoor ponies to encourage early successional plants such as marsh orchid and meadow thistle, and to suppress vigorous grasses, reed and saplings. This is considered to be a more effective means of management than cutting. However, some meadows on site are still cut for hay.

References

External links
Natural England data sheet

Bogs of England
Landforms of North Yorkshire
Sites of Special Scientific Interest in North Yorkshire
Yorkshire Wildlife Trust reserves
Nature reserves in North Yorkshire